Azarestanak (also Romanized as Āzārestānak; also known as Āzārestān) is a village in Deylaman Rural District, Deylaman District, Siahkal County, Gilan Province, Iran. At the 2006 census, its population was 36, in 10 families.

References 

Populated places in Siahkal County